NISP may refer to:

 National Industrial Security Program (USA)
 Neighborhood Internet service provider
 Number of Identified Specimens, used when counting remnants in archeology
 Catalyst (science park) (UK), formerly Northern Ireland Science Park
 NATO Interoperability Standards and Profiles
 National Solar Observatory's Integrated Synoptic Program (USA)
 Bank OCBC NISP, a bank in Indonesia